Walter Glen Hollander (September 8, 1896 – December 10, 1990) was a member of the Wisconsin State Senate.

Biography
Hollander was born on September 8, 1896 in Fond du Lac County, Wisconsin. He graduated from Omro High School in Omro, Wisconsin. He died on December 10, 1990.

Career
Hollander was first elected to the Senate in 1956 and remained a member until 1976, at which time he was succeeded by future Governor of Wisconsin Scott McCallum. Previously, he was a member of the Board of Fond du Lac County from 1938 to 1966, serving as Chairman from 1953 to 1966. He was a Republican.

References

People from Fond du Lac County, Wisconsin
People from Omro, Wisconsin
County supervisors in Wisconsin
Republican Party Wisconsin state senators
1896 births
1990 deaths
20th-century American politicians